Moäng Ratu Dona Ines Ximenes da Silva of Flores, in present-day Indonesia, (fl. c. 1700), was the lady sovereign of the island-principality of Flores. She was a member of the Portuguese Ximenes da Silva dynasty, who continued to rule over the island until 1952 and continued as civil rulers until 1960 over Sikka.

She succeeded her brother Moäng Ratu Don Simao (Samaoh) as ruler. She ruled over a Roman Catholic principality at the island of Flores. 

She was succeeded by the grandson of a brother of her mother Moäng Ratu Don Siku Koru.

Sources
Women in Power: Moäng Ratu Dona Ines Ximenes da Silva of Flores (Indonesia)
 https://guide2womenleaders.com/indonesia_substates.htm

Portuguese colonialism in Indonesia
18th-century women rulers